The eighth government of Lebanon was formed On 5 January 1937, headed by Khayreddin al-Ahdab, with 3 other National Bloc ministers as no Constitutionals took part in it. On 2 February, the cabinet won the confidence of the parliament by a small margin with 13 votes for and 12 against. In 13 March, the Prime Minister delivered his resignation to the president.

Composition

References 

Cabinets established in 1937
Cabinets disestablished in 1937
Cabinets of Lebanon
1937 establishments in Lebanon
1937 disestablishments in Lebanon